Budha Theh  is a village in Kapurthala district of Punjab State, India. The village is administrated by a Sarpanch who is an elected representative of village as per the constitution of India and Panchayati raj (India).

Demography 
According to the report published by Census India in 2011, Budha Theh has a total number of 91 houses and population of 477 of which include 246 males and 231 females. Literacy rate of Budha Theh is   74.51%, lower than state average of 75.84%.  The population of children under the age of 6 years is 65 which is 13.63% of total population of Budha Theh, and child sex ratio is approximately  1031, higher than state average of 846.

Population data

Air travel connectivity 
The closest airport to the village is Sri Guru Ram Dass Jee International Airport.

Villages in Kapurthala

External links
  Villages in Kapurthala
 Kapurthala Villages List

References

Villages in Kapurthala district